David Nicholas (born 1991) is an Australian cyclist.

David Nicholas may also refer to:

David Nicholas, English form of Dafydd Nicolas (c.1705–1774), Welsh poet
Dai Nicholas (David Nicholas, 1897–1982), footballer
David Nicholas (journalist) (1930–2022), British journalist
David Nicholas, music producer on Reasons for Voyaging

See also